Clarence William Jones (born March 18, 1966) is an American former professional basketball player. His professional career spanned from 1989 to 2001, and included stops in the National Basketball Association, Continental Basketball Association, France, Italy, and Venezuela.

College career
Jones played college basketball at the University of Iowa, from 1984–85 to 1987–88. He scored 981 career points, and helped lead the Hawkeyes to four consecutive berths into the NCAA Tournament. He appeared in 125 games, and averaged 7.8 points and 3.3 rebounds per game.

Professional career
Although he was not selected in the NBA draft, Jones would play a total of 37 games in the 1988–89 NBA season, with the New Jersey Nets, where he averaged 3.5 points and 1.3 rebounds per game.

Other professional highlights included being named to the CBA All-Rookie First Team in 1988–89, the All-CBA Second Team in 1989–90, and the CBA All-Star Game, in 1995.

Jones retired from professional basketball after the 2000–01 season. As of March 2012 he owns a bank security company in his home state of Michigan.

Since the inception of the team, Jones has served as head coach of the Windsor Express in the NBL of Canada.

References

1966 births
Living people
American expatriate basketball people in Canada
American expatriate basketball people in France
American expatriate basketball people in Italy
American expatriate basketball people in Venezuela
American men's basketball players
Basket Rimini Crabs players
Basketball coaches from Michigan
Basketball players from Detroit
BCM Gravelines players
Gaiteros del Zulia players
Iowa Hawkeyes men's basketball players
Montpellier Paillade Basket players
New Jersey Nets players
Paris Racing Basket players
Power forwards (basketball)
Quad City Thunder players
Southwestern High School (Michigan) alumni
Undrafted National Basketball Association players